Hill Kourkoutis (born 23 January 1988) is a Canadian songwriter, producer, mixer, engineer, multi-instrumentalist, director and actress.

Biography

Early life
Hill was born in Toronto, Ontario, Canada and is of Greek descent.

Career

Music

Hill Kourkoutis is a producer and songwriter whose work spans multiple genres. She has produced albums and/or singles for artists such as Digging Roots, Amanda Rheaume, Cassie Dasilva, SATE, Leela Gilday, Madison Violet, Jules, The Cliks and Martha and The Muffins.  She has also remixed for artists July Talk, Adam Cohen, Dear Rouge, Jill Barber and Good Lovelies.  As a songwriter, she has written songs for artists such as Royal Wood, Meghan Patrick, POESY, Jules and Martha and the Muffins.  She primarily works out of her studio, The Lair. Kourkoutis was a part of many bands including alternative pop/rock duo "Drowning Girl" with David Paoli before starting Hill & The Sky Heroes - her collaborative solo project. As a session musician and a live side player, Hill has played and/or toured with Serena Ryder, The Weeknd, Martha and the Muffins, Danny Michel, SATE, The Cliks and Tara Slone.  

Hill has also composed music for Dino Ranch, Remy %26 Boo and Thomas %26 Friends: All Engines Go. 

In 2018, she appeared on the CTV Series The Launch (created by Scott Borchetta) playing guitar in the show's house band for two seasons.

In 2021 'North Star Calling', the album she produced and mixed for Leela Gilday, won the Juno Award for Indigenous Artist or Group of the Year and was nominated for the Juno Award for Contemporary Roots Album of the Year.  The album was also nominated for two Canadian Folk Music Awards including Single of the Year for "K'eintah Natse Ju". 

In March 2022, Kourkoutis became the first woman to receive a Juno Award nomination for Recording Engineer of the Year. She was nominated for her work on SATE's "Howler" and Tania Joy's "The Drought". She won the award, becoming the first-ever female winner in the category. SATE's album, 'The Fool', that Kourkoutis produced, engineered, mixed and wrote on was also nominated for Alternative Album of the Year.

In 2023 the albums she produced, engineered, mixed and co-wrote on for Digging Roots ('Zhawenim') and Aysanabee ('Watin') were nominated in the Juno Award for Contemporary Indigenous Artist of the Year category.

Film

At the age of 16, Hill was cast in a reoccurring role on the hit television series Radio Free Roscoe (Noggin/The Family Channel) as the strong but silent drummer Megan.
This led her to her studies at Ryerson University where she received a Bachelor of Fine Arts with Honours in Film Studies. 
She has directed music videos for Serena Ryder, Mother Mother, Sass Jordan and Alex Cuba.

Discography

Select Discography

Remixes

Composing

Filmography

Music videos (as director)

 Hill & The Sky Heroes - “Doctor, Doctor” (2012)
 Serena Ryder & The Beauties - “Ramblin’ Man” (2010)
 Serena Ryder & The Beauties - “No Air” (2010)
 Serena Ryder & The Beauties - “The Funeral” (2010)
 Serena Ryder & The Beauties - “Ramblin’ Man” (2010)
 Modern Superstitions - “Visions Of You” (2010)
 San Sebastian - “Young Youth” (2010)
 Diego Gomes - “My Best Friend’s Girl” - YTV/The Next Star (2010)
 Madi Amyotte - “Front Row” - YTV/The Next Star (2010)
 Delhi2Dublin - “Tommy” (2010)
 KAY - “M.A.J.O.R” (2010)
 Michou - “Eavesdropping” (2010)
 San Sebastian - “Wake Up” (2010)
 You Say Party! - “There is XXXX (Within My Heart)” (2010)
 Alex Cuba - “If You Give Me Love” (2009)
 Crystal Shawanda - “I’ll Be Home For Christmas” (2009)
 Sass Jordan - “Why Did You?” (2009)
 Mother Mother - “Hayloft” (2009)
 Theo Tams - “Lazy Lovers” (2009)
 Serena Ryder - “All For Love” (2009)
 Drowning Girl - “Tragic Romantic” (2008)
 Tara Slone - “My Little Secret” (2006)

Shorts/PSA’s

 ACTRA: TAWC Toolkit PSA (2012)…Director
 Electric Red (2010)…Director
 The Flock (2010)…Director, Writer
 …And The Planets Conspire (2008)…Director, Writer
 Star Maker Machinery (2008)…Director, Writer
 Go Pomo! (2008)…Director, Writer
 Thousand Pound Eyelids (2006)…Director, Writer

Television
 2018-2019 - The Launch - Herself, 14 Episodes, House Band (Guitarist)
 2014 - The 43rd Annual Juno Awards - Herself, Musician for Serena Ryder, “What I Wouldn’t Do/“, “For You”
 2013 - 2013 Much Music Video Awards - Herself, Musician for Serena Ryder, “Stompa/What I Wouldn’t Do”
 2013 - The 42nd Annual Juno Awards - Herself, Musician for Serena Ryder, “Stompa”
 2013 - The Tonight Show With Jay Leno - Herself, Episode #21.182 (Musician for Serena Ryder, “Stompa”)
 2011 - Serena Ryder Set List - Herself, Musician for Serena Ryder, “The Funeral”
 2010 - The Next Star - Herself, 1 Episode, Director
 2004-2015 - Radio Free Roscoe - Megan, 10 Episodes

External links

References

Canadian record producers
Canadian women record producers
Canadian songwriters
1988 births
Living people
Juno Award for Recording Engineer of the Year winners